The Rabi problem concerns the response of an atom to an applied harmonic electric field, with an applied frequency very close to the atom's natural frequency.  It provides a simple and generally solvable example of light–atom interactions and is named after Isidor Isaac Rabi.

Classical Rabi problem 

In the classical approach, the Rabi problem can be represented by the solution to the driven damped harmonic oscillator with the electric part of the Lorentz force as the driving term:

 

where it has been assumed that the atom can be treated as a charged particle (of charge e) oscillating about its equilibrium position around a neutral atom. Here xa is its instantaneous magnitude of oscillation,  its natural oscillation frequency, and  its natural lifetime:

 

which has been calculated based on the dipole oscillator's energy loss from electromagnetic radiation.

To apply this to the Rabi problem, one assumes that the electric field E is oscillatory in time and constant in space:

 

and xa is decomposed into a part ua that is in-phase with the driving E field (corresponding to dispersion) and a part va that is out of phase (corresponding to absorption):

 

Here x0 is assumed to be constant, but ua and va are allowed to vary in time.

With these assumptions, the Lorentz force equations for the in-phase and out-of-phase parts can be rewritten as

 
 

where we have replaced the natural lifetime  with a more general effective lifetime T (which could include other interactions such as collisions) and have dropped the subscript a in favor of the newly defined detuning , which serves equally well to distinguish atoms of different resonant frequencies. Finally, the constant

 

has been defined.

These equations can be solved as follows:

 
 

After all transients have died away, the steady-state solution takes the simple form

 

where "c.c." stands for the complex conjugate of the opposing term.

Two-level atom

Semiclassical approach

The classical Rabi problem gives some basic results and a simple to understand picture of the issue, but in order to understand phenomena such as inversion, spontaneous emission, and the Bloch–Siegert shift, a fully quantum-mechanical treatment is necessary.

The simplest approach is through the two-level atom approximation, in which one only treats two energy levels of the atom in question. No atom with only two energy levels exists in reality, but a transition between, for example, two hyperfine states in an atom can be treated, to first approximation, as if only those two levels existed, assuming the drive is not too far off resonance.

The convenience of the two-level atom is that any two-level system evolves in essentially the same way as a spin-1/2 system, in accordance to the Bloch equations, which define the dynamics of the pseudo-spin vector in an electric field:

 
 
 

where we have made the rotating wave approximation in throwing out terms with high angular velocity (and thus small effect on the total spin dynamics over long time periods) and transformed into a set of coordinates rotating at a frequency .

There is a clear analogy here between these equations and those that defined the evolution of the in-phase and out-of-phase components of oscillation in the classical case. Now, however, there is a third term w, which can be interpreted as the population difference between the excited and ground state (varying from −1 to represent completely in the ground state to +1, completely in the excited state). Keep in mind that for the classical case, there was a continuous energy spectrum that the atomic oscillator could occupy, while for the quantum case (as we've assumed) there are only two possible (eigen)states of the problem.

These equations can also be stated in matrix form:

 

It is noteworthy that these equations can be written as a vector precession equation:

 

where  is the pseudo-spin vector, and  acts as an effective torque.

As before, the Rabi problem is solved by assuming that the electric field E is oscillatory with constant magnitude E0: . In this case, the solution can be found by applying two successive rotations to the matrix equation above, of the form

 

and

 

where

 
 

Here the frequency  is known as the generalized Rabi frequency, which gives the rate of precession of the pseudo-spin vector about the transformed u axis (given by the first coordinate transformation above). This is known as a -pulse and has the result of a complete inversion.

The general result is given by

 

The expression for the inversion w can be greatly simplified if the atom is assumed to be initially in its ground state (w0 = −1) with u0 = v0 = 0, in which case

Rabi Problem in time-dependent perturbation theory 
In the quantum approach, the periodic driving force can be considered as periodic perturbation and, therefore, the problem can be solved using time-dependent perturbation theory, with

 

Assume at time , we can expand the state as

 

where  represents the eigenstates of the unperturbed states. For an unperturbed system,  is a constant.
Now, let's calculate  under a periodic perturbation . Applying operator  on both sides of the previous equation, we can get

 

and then multiply both sides of the equation by :

 

, it becomes a normal-mode problem of a two-level system, and it is easy to find that 

 

where 

The possibility of being in the state m at time t is

 

The value of  depends on the initial condition of the system. 

An exact solution of spin-1/2 system in an oscillating magnetic field is solved by Rabi (1937). From their work, it is clear that the Rabi oscillation frequency is proportional to the magnitude of oscillation magnetic field.

Quantum field theory approach
In Bloch's approach, the field is not quantized, and neither the resulting coherence nor the resonance is well explained.

 for the QFT approach, mainly Jaynes–Cummings model.

See also
 Rabi cycle
 Rabi frequency
 Vacuum Rabi oscillation

References 

 

 

Atomic physics
Spintronics